Naturally occurring lithium (3Li) is composed of two stable isotopes, lithium-6 and lithium-7, with the latter being far more abundant on Earth. The longest-lived radioisotope of lithium is lithium-8, which has a half-life of just . All of the remaining isotopes of lithium have half-lives that are shorter than 10 nanoseconds.

Lithium-7 and lithium-6 are two of the primordial nuclides that were produced in the Big Bang, with lithium-7 to be 10−9 of all primordial nuclides, and lithium-6 around 10−13. A small percentage of lithium-6 is also known to be produced by nuclear reactions in certain stars. The isotopes of lithium separate somewhat during a variety of geological processes, including mineral formation (chemical precipitation and ion exchange). Lithium ions replace magnesium or iron in certain octahedral locations in clays, and lithium-6 is sometimes preferred over lithium-7. This results in some enrichment of lithium-6 in geological processes.

Lithium-6 is an important isotope in nuclear physics because when it is bombarded with neutrons, tritium is produced.

List of isotopes 

|-
| 
| style="text-align:right" | 3
| style="text-align:right" | 0
| #
| 
| p ?
|  ?
| 3/2−#
|
|
|-
| 
| style="text-align:right" | 3
| style="text-align:right" | 1
| 
| []
| p
| 
| 2−
|
|
|-
| 
| style="text-align:right" | 3
| style="text-align:right" | 2
| 
| []
| p
| 
| 3/2−
|
|
|-
| 
| style="text-align:right" | 3
| style="text-align:right" | 3
| 
| colspan="3" style="text-align:center;"|Stable
| 1+
| style="text-align:center" colspan="2"|[, ]
|-
| style="text-indent:1em" | 
| colspan="3" style="text-indent:2em" | 
| 
| IT
| 
| 0+
|
|
|-
| 
| style="text-align:right" | 3
| style="text-align:right" | 4
| 
| colspan="3" style="text-align:center;"|Stable
| 3/2−
| colspan="2" style="text-align:center"|[, ]
|-
| 
| style="text-align:right" | 3
| style="text-align:right" | 5
| 
| 
| β−
| 
| 2+
|
|
|-
| rowspan="2"|
| rowspan="2" style="text-align:right" | 3
| rowspan="2" style="text-align:right" | 6
| rowspan="2"|
| rowspan="2"|
| β−n
| 
| rowspan="2"|3/2−
| rowspan="2"|
| rowspan="2"|
|-
| β−
| 
|-
| 
| style="text-align:right" | 3
| style="text-align:right" | 7
| 
| []
| n
| 
| (1−, 2−)
|
|
|-
| style="text-indent:1em" | 
| colspan="3" style="text-indent:2em" | 
| 
| IT
| 
| 1+
|
|
|-
| style="text-indent:1em" | 
| colspan="3" style="text-indent:2em" | 
| []
| IT
| 
| 2+
|
|
|-
| rowspan=7|
| rowspan=7 style="text-align:right" | 3
| rowspan=7 style="text-align:right" | 8
| rowspan=7|
| rowspan=7|
| β−n
| 
| rowspan=7|3/2−
| rowspan=7|
| rowspan=7|
|-
| β−
| 
|-
| β−2n
| 
|-
| β−3n
| 
|-
| β−α
| 
|-
| β−d
| 
|-
| β−t
| 
|-
| 
| style="text-align:right" | 3
| style="text-align:right" | 9
| 
|
| n ?
|  ?
| (1−, 2−)
|
|
|-
| 
| style="text-align:right" | 3
| style="text-align:right" | 10
| 
| []
| 2n
| 
| 3/2−#
|
|

Isotope separation

Colex separation 
Lithium-6 has a greater affinity than lithium-7 for the element mercury. When an amalgam of lithium and mercury is added to solutions containing lithium hydroxide, the lithium-6 becomes more concentrated in the amalgam and the lithium-7 more in the hydroxide solution.

The colex (column exchange) separation method makes use of this by passing a counter-flow of amalgam and hydroxide through a cascade of stages. The fraction of lithium-6 is preferentially drained by the mercury, but the lithium-7 flows mostly with the hydroxide.
At the bottom of the column, the lithium (enriched with lithium-6) is separated from the amalgam, and the mercury is recovered to be reused with fresh raw material. At the top, the lithium hydroxide solution is electrolyzed to liberate the lithium-7 fraction. The enrichment obtained with this method varies with the column length and the flow speed.

Vacuum distillation 
Lithium atoms evaporate from the liquid surface and are collected on a cold surface positioned a few centimetres above the liquid surface. Since lithium-6 atoms have a greater mean free path, they are collected preferentially.

The theoretical separation efficiency is about 8.0 percent. A multistage process may be used to obtain higher degrees of separation.

Lithium-3
Lithium-3, also known as the triproton, would consist of three protons and zero neutrons. It was reported as proton unbound in 1969, but this result was not accepted and its existence is thus unproven. No other resonances attributable to  have been reported, and it is expected to decay by prompt proton emission (much like the diproton).

Lithium-4
Lithium-4 contains three protons and one neutron. Lithium-4 can be formed as an intermediate in some nuclear fusion reactions.

Lithium-6
Lithium-6 is valuable as the source material for the production of tritium (hydrogen-3) and as an absorber of neutrons in nuclear fusion reactions. Between 1.9% and 7.8% of terrestrial lithium  in normal materials consists of lithium-6, with the rest being lithium-7. Large amounts of lithium-6 have been separated out for placing into thermonuclear weapons. The separation of lithium-6 has by now ceased in the large thermonuclear powers, but stockpiles of it remain in these countries.

The deuterium–tritium fusion reaction has been investigated as a possible energy source, as it is currently the only fusion reaction with sufficient energy output for feasible implementation. In this scenario, lithium enriched in lithium-6 would be required to generate the necessary quantities of tritium. Mineral and brine lithium resources are a potential limiting factor in this scenario, but seawater can eventually also be used. Pressurized heavy-water reactors such as the CANDU produce small quantities of tritium in their coolant/moderator from neutron absorption and this is sometimes extracted as an alternative to the use of Lithium-6.

Lithium-6 is one of only three stable isotopes with a spin of 1, the others being deuterium and nitrogen-14,
and has the smallest nonzero nuclear electric quadrupole moment of any stable nucleus.

Lithium-7 

Lithium-7 is by far the most abundant isotope of lithium, making up between 92.2% and 98.1% of all terrestrial lithium. A lithium-7 atom contains three protons, four neutrons, and three electrons.
Because of its nuclear properties, lithium-7 is less common than helium, carbon, nitrogen, or oxygen in the Universe, even though the latter three all have heavier nuclei.

The industrial production of lithium-6 results in a waste product which is enriched in lithium-7 and depleted in lithium-6. This material has been sold commercially, and some of it has been released into the environment. A relative abundance of lithium-7, as high as 35 percent greater than the natural value, has been measured in the ground water in a carbonate aquifer underneath the West Valley Creek in Pennsylvania, which is downstream from a lithium processing plant. The isotopic composition of lithium in normal materials can vary somewhat depending on its origin, which determines its relative atomic mass in the source material. An accurate relative atomic mass for samples of lithium cannot be measured for all sources of lithium.

Lithium-7 is used as a part of the molten lithium fluoride in molten salt reactors: liquid-fluoride nuclear reactors. The large neutron absorption cross section of lithium-6 (about 940 barns)
as compared with the very small neutron cross section of lithium-7 (about 45 millibarns) makes high separation of lithium-7 from natural lithium a strong requirement for the possible use in lithium fluoride reactors.

Lithium-7 hydroxide is used for alkalizing of the coolant in pressurized water reactors.

Some lithium-7 has been produced, for a few picoseconds, which contains a lambda particle in its nucleus, whereas an atomic nucleus is generally thought to contain only neutrons and protons.

Lithium-8 

Lithium-8 has been proposed as a source of 6.4 MeV electron antineutrinos generated by the inverse beta decay to Beryllium-8. The ISODAR particle physics collaboration describes a scheme to generated Lithium-8 for immediate decay by bombarding stable Lithium-7 with 60 MeV protons created by a cyclotron particle accelerator.

Lithium-11 
Lithium-11 is thought to possess a halo nucleus consisting of a core of three protons and eight neutrons, two of which are in a nuclear halo.

Lithium-12 
Lithium-12 has a considerably shorter half-life. It decays by neutron emission into , which decays as mentioned above.

Decay chains
While β− decay into isotopes of beryllium (often combined with single- or multiple-neutron emission) is predominant in heavier isotopes of lithium,  and  decay via neutron emission into  and  respectively due to their positions beyond the neutron drip line. Lithium-11 has also been observed to decay via multiple forms of fission. Isotopes lighter than  decay exclusively by proton emission, as they are beyond the proton drip line.

See also 

 Cosmological lithium problem
 
 Halo nucleus

References

External links

 
Lithium
Lithium